Larena, officially the Municipality of Larena, is a 5th class municipality in the province of Siquijor, Philippines. According to the 2020 census, it has a population of 14,454 people.

It was the former capital of the province of Siquijor.

Larena Port is the main gateway to Siquijor island as it is the largest port. It can accommodate ships up to 1,000 tons and is serviced by five shipping companies, providing passenger and cargo service to Santander and Cebu City in Cebu; Tagbilaran in Bohol; Dumaguete in Negros Oriental, and Plaridel in Misamis Occidental.

History

Canoan, which was how Larena was known during the Spanish period, had long been a flourishing township. It was mainly due to this fact that the Spanish authorities developed it into a headtown or cabecera for the whole island of Siquijor.

American Period

With the coming of the Americans at the turn of the century, Canoan still was regarded as a cabecera where lieutenant governor James Fugate, the first American governor of Siquijor, held office for sixteen years ending in 1916. In the same year, the authorities in Manila, acting on the recommendation of local authorities officially declared Canoan as a capital town. During his term which began in 1901, Governor Demetrio Larena, the first Filipino governor for Negros Oriental and Siquijor, changed the name of Canoan to Larena, his own name, which was duly approved by the Philippine legislature.

From then on until the declaration of martial law in 1972, several people shared the mayoral seat after every four years.
Albito was followed by Restituto Calibo. Then Antonio Albito again. In the following election, he was replaced by Herbert Calibo, who in turn was followed by Soledado Lumosad. Juanito Calibo followed and stayed for most of the martial law era and again succeeded by Herbert Calibo.

The post-EDSA Revolution saw Remedios Albito mayor until the present, having beat others in three elections since then.  Thus the intertwined dynasties continue.

All through the years, spanning the time before and after the war, Larena maintained its position as the hub of business activities in the province. The small but safe port of Larena is a strategic port of call for merchant ships from major cities in Central Visayas and Northern Mindanao. It is home to two commercial banks and a rural bank. Nationally known commercial establishments usually set their shops here.

Geography

Barangays
Larena comprises 23 barangays:

Note: There is a boundary dispute between barangay Sabang, municipality of Larena, and barangay Sabang, municipality of Siquijor.

Climate

Demographics

Economy

Education
One of the remaining bright spots of the town of Larena is the continuous evolution of one of its educational institutions. The Larena sub-provincial High School, another landmark, evolved to become the Larena National Vocational School and then the Larena National Vocational College, drawing to its fold a great number of young people from all over the province and neighboring provinces.

On 3 March 1995, LNVC was converted into a state college now known as Siquijor State College (SSC). In 2006, a second campus was named SSC-Lazi campus in the town of Lazi.

Gallery

References

External links
 Larena Profile at PhilAtlas.com
 [ Philippine Standard Geographic Code]

Municipalities of Siquijor
Former provincial capitals of the Philippines